Mohammad Reza Ahmadi (born 26 December 1982 in Tehran, Iran) is a commentator and presenter of sports programs in IRIB. In 1999, Ahmadi tested TV for a commentator who was rejected and said he was too young and early; then he entered the radio in 2003 and began commentating.

Programs

References 

1982 births
Living people
Iranian television presenters
Iranian radio and television presenters